Coumalic acid is an organic compound with the molecular formula C6H4O4.
Its melting point is around 210 °C.

In laboratory coumalic acid may be obtained by self-condensation of malic acid in fuming sulfuric acid:

References

2-Pyrones
Carboxylic acids